Bythopsyrna is a genus of Asian planthoppers belonging to the family Flatidae.

Species
FLOW includes:
 Bythopsyrna circulata  (Guérin-Méneville, 1844)  - type species
 Bythopsyrna copulanda  (Distant, 1892) 
 Bythopsyrna ebonfana  Medler, 1999 
 Bythopsyrna intermedia  Schmidt, 1913 
 Bythopsyrna raapi  Schmidt, 1912 
 Bythopsyrna sumatrana  Schmidt, 1904 
 Bythopsyrna tineoides  (Olivier, 1791) 
 Bythopsyrna trichrousa  Peng, Zhang & Wang, 2010 
Bythopsyrna violacea  Schmidt, 1904

References

Flatidae
Auchenorrhyncha genera